Laclede County Jail, also known as Laclede County Museum, was a historic jail located at Lebanon, Laclede County, Missouri.  The original section was built in 1876, with living quarters for the sheriff added in 1913.  It was a two-story, "T"-shaped brick building with a low-pitched hipped roof.  It was maintained by the Laclede County Historical Society, which used the facility as a museum. It was demolished for safety reasons in 2021.

It was listed on the National Register of Historic Places in 2005 and was removed in 2022.

References

History museums in Missouri
Government buildings on the National Register of Historic Places in Missouri
Government buildings completed in 1876
Buildings and structures in Laclede County, Missouri
National Register of Historic Places in Laclede County, Missouri
1876 establishments in Missouri